Qaleh Jiq-e Kuchek (also Romanized as Qal‘eh Jīq-e Kūchek and Qal‘eh-ye Jīq Kūchek; also known as Qal‘eh Chīq Kūḩek and Qal‘eh Jīn-e Kūchek) is a village in Jafarbay-ye Sharqi Rural District, Gomishan District, Torkaman County, Golestan Province, Iran. At the 2006 census, its population was 87, in 15 families.

References 

Populated places in Torkaman County